Charles Frederick, Jr. is a former American football wide receiver. Frederick was born in Lake Worth, Florida, on February 2, 1982. He played wide receiver for the University of Washington. He was signed as a free agent by the Spokane Shock in 2006. Frederick was the co-AFL Rookie of the Year in 2007 with the Kansas City Brigade. On January 13, 2012, it was announced that Frederick would return to the Shock for the 2012 season.

Awards and honours
In 2007, Frederick was named the AFL Rookie of the Year.

See also

 Washington Huskies football statistical leaders

References

External links
 Washington Huskies Bio
 Just Sports Stats
 Jacksonville Sharks Bio

1982 births
Living people
American football wide receivers
American football defensive backs
Spokane Shock players
Kansas City Brigade players
Jacksonville Sharks players
Washington Huskies football players
People from Lake Worth Beach, Florida